Ernst Louis Kalkowsky (1851–1938) was a German geologist and museum scientist.
His paper "Oolith and Stromatolith im Norddeutschen Bundsandstein" was one of the most important contributions to understand stromatolitic structures.

Works
 Elemente der Lithologie, 1886.
 Der Nephrit des Bodensees. Dresden: Wilhelm Baensch, 1906.
 Oolith and Stromatolith im Norddeutschen Bundsandstein, 1908.

References

1851 births
1938 deaths
19th-century German geologists
20th-century German geologists